Henan Mongol Autonomous County is an autonomous county in the south of Huangnan Tibetan Autonomous Prefecture in the province of Qinghai, China, bordering Gansu Province to the south and east. Its administrative seat ("capital") is the town of Yêgainnyin (Youganning). The Mongols or Upper Mongols (Sogwo Arig), the overwhelming majority of the inhabitants of the county, do not speak Mongolian (with relatively few exceptions) and speak primarily Putonghua Chinese and Tibetan.

Ethnic groups in Henan, 2000 census

Climate

See also
 List of administrative divisions of Qinghai

References

Mongol autonomous counties
County-level divisions of Qinghai
Huangnan Tibetan Autonomous Prefecture